Twenty questions is a spoken parlor game, which encourages deductive reasoning and creativity. It originated in the United States and was played widely in the 19th century.  It escalated in popularity during the late 1940s, when it became the format for a successful weekly radio quiz program.

In the traditional game, the "answerer" chooses something that the other players, the "questioners", must guess. They take turns asking a question which the answerer must answer with "yes" or "no". In variants of the game, answers such as "maybe" are allowed. Sample questions could be: "Is it bigger than a breadbox?", "Is it alive?", and finally "Is it this pen?" Lying is not allowed. If a questioner guesses the correct answer, they win and become the answerer for the next round. If 20 questions are asked without a correct guess, then the answerer has stumped the questioners and gets to be the answerer for another round.

Careful selection of questions can greatly improve the odds of the questioner winning the game. For example, a question such as "Does it involve technology for communications, entertainment or work?" can allow the questioner to cover a broad range of areas using a single question that can be answered with a simple "yes" or "no", significantly narrowing down the possibilities.

Popular variants
A variant is called "animal, vegetable, or mineral". This is taken from the Linnaean taxonomy of the natural world. In this version, the answerer tells the questioners at the start of the game whether the subject belongs to the animal, vegetable or mineral kingdom. These categories can produce odd technicalities, such as a wooden table being classified as a vegetable (since wood comes from trees), or a belt being both animal (if leather) or vegetable (if cloth), and mineral (if it has a metal or plastic buckle). Another variant is "person, place, or thing".

Other versions specify that the item to be guessed should be in a given category, such as actions, occupations, famous people, etc. In Hungary a similar game is named after Simon bar Kokhba. A version of twenty questions called yes and no is played as a parlour game by characters in Charles Dickens' A Christmas Carol.

Computers, scientific method and situation puzzles

The abstract mathematical version of the game where some answers may be wrong is sometimes called Ulam's game or the Rényi–Ulam game. The game suggests that the information (as measured by Shannon's entropy statistic) required to identify an arbitrary object is at most 20 bits. The game is often used as an example when teaching people about information theory. Mathematically, if each question is structured to eliminate half the objects, 20 questions allow the questioner to distinguish between 220 =  objects. Accordingly, the most effective strategy for twenty questions is to ask questions that will split the field of remaining possibilities roughly in half each time. The process is analogous to a binary search algorithm in computer science or successive-approximation ADC in analog-to-digital signal conversion.

In 1901 Charles Sanders Peirce discussed factors in the economy of research that govern the selection of a hypothesis for trial: (1) cheapness, (2) intrinsic value (instinctive naturalness and reasoned likelihood), and (3) relation (caution, breadth, and incomplexity) to other projects (other hypotheses and inquiries). He discussed the potential of twenty questions to single one subject out from among 220 and, pointing to skilful caution, said:

He elaborated on how, if that principle had been followed in the investigation of light, its investigators would have saved themselves half a century of work. Testing the smallest logical components of a hypothesis one at a time does not mean asking about, say,  subjects one at a time, but extracting aspects of a guess or hypothesis, and asking, for example, "Did an animal do this?" before asking "Did a horse do this?".

That aspect of scientific method resembles also a situation puzzle in facing (unlike twenty questions) a puzzling scenario at the start. Both games involve asking yes/no questions, but Twenty Questions places a greater premium on efficiency of questioning. A limit on their likeness to the scientific process of trying hypotheses is that a hypothesis, because of its scope, can be harder to test for truth (test for a "yes") than to test for falsity (test for a "no") or vice versa.

In developing the participatory anthropic principle (PAP), which is an interpretation of quantum mechanics, theoretical physicist John Archibald Wheeler used a variant on twenty questions, called surprise twenty questions, to show how the questions we choose to ask about the universe may dictate the answers we get. In this variant, the respondent does not choose or decide upon any particular or definite object beforehand, but only on a pattern of "yes" or "no" answers.  This variant requires the respondent to provide a consistent set of answers to successive questions, so that each answer can be viewed as logically compatible with all the previous answers. In this way, successive questions narrow the options until the questioner settles upon a definite object. Wheeler's theory was that, in an analogous manner, consciousness may play some role in bringing the universe into existence.

Radio and TV quiz

United States
In the 1940s, the game became a popular radio panel quiz show, Twenty Questions, first broadcast at 8 pm, Saturday, February 2, 1946, on the Mutual Broadcasting System from New York's Longacre Theatre on West 48th Street. Radio listeners sent in subjects for the panelists to guess in twenty questions; Winston Churchill's cigar was the subject most frequently submitted. On the early shows, listeners who stumped the panel won a lifetime subscription to Pageant. From 1946 to 1951, the program was sponsored by Ronson lighters. In 1952–1953, Wildroot Cream-Oil was the sponsor.

As a television series, Twenty Questions debuted as a local show in New York on WOR-TV Channel 9 on November 2, 1949. Beginning on November 26, the series went nationwide on NBC until December 24, after which it remained dormant until March 17, 1950, when it was picked up by ABC until June 29, 1951.

Its longest and best-known run, however, is the one on the DuMont Television Network from July 6, 1951, to May 30, 1954. During this time, original host Bill Slater was replaced by Jay Jackson. After this run ended, ABC picked up the series once again from July 6, 1954, to May 3, 1955. The last radio show had been broadcast on March 27, 1954.

Canada 
Twenty Questions aired locally on CJAY-TV in Winnipeg, Canada from March to June, 1961 and then on the new CTV network beginning in September, 1961; its host, Stewart Macpherson, went on to become the original host of the UK version.

Hungary 
The story goes that the Romans cut out a spy's tongue, so when he reached bar Kokhba's camp, he was only able to nod or shake his head to answer bar Kokhba's questions. The number of questions is not limited to twenty.

 was played by Frigyes Karinthy and his company in Budapest back in 1911. So the game started in Hungary from the New York café in Budapest.

 was staged as a television game show  (later renamed ) on the Hungarian national television Magyar Televízió from 1975 to 1991. It was the first show presented by István Vágó, who would later host the Hungarian versions of Jeopardy! and Who Wants to be a Millionaire?.

Ireland 
A bi-lingual (Irish/English) version of Twenty Questions aired on RTE Radio 1 in the 1960s and 1970s. It was hosted by Gearóid Ó Tighearnaigh, written by Dick O'Donovan and produced by Bill O'Donovan (occasional panelist) and included Dominic O’Riordan, Tony Ó Dálaigh, Seán Ó Murchú and Máire Noone on the panel. It proved enormously popular, travelling the length and breadth of Ireland, hosted in local clubs and community halls.

Norway 
NRK aired its own version continuously from 1947 to the early 1980s. In 2004, the radio series was revived and regained its popularity, leading to a 2006 TV version. The Norwegian  continues on NRK radio and TV, and a web-based game is available at the official NRK website. A 2006 board game based on the series is currently the prize sent to listeners who beat the panel.

Poland 
Polish version,  was shown in TVP1 in 1960s, hosts were Ryszard Serafinowicz and Joanna Rostocka. In Polish version there were three 3-player teams: mathematicians, journalists and mixed team from Łódź. Show was cancelled due to scandal, when it turned out that mathematicians used binary search algorithm to answer the questions, using to it Wielka Encyklopedia Powszechna PWN.

United Kingdom 
The BBC aired a version on radio from 28 February 1947 to 1976 with TV specials airing in 1947 and 1948 plus a series from 1956 to 1957. On radio, the subject to be guessed was revealed to the audience by a "mystery voice" (originally Norman Hackforth from 1947 to 1962; he was later a regular panelist). Hackforth became well known amongst the British public as much for his aloofness as his apparent knowledgeability.

The series was originally presented by Stewart MacPherson. The panel comprised Richard Dimbleby, Jack Train, Anona Winn and Joy Adamson, in later years comedian Peter Glaze also. A later presenter, Gilbert Harding, was ousted in 1960 by producer Ian Messiter when, after having drunk a triple gin-and-tonic he had originally offered to Messiter, proceeded to completely ruin the night's game – he insulted two panelists, failed to recognise a correct identification after seven questions (after revealing the answer upon the 20th question, he yelled at the panel and audience), and ended the show three minutes early by saying "I'm fed up with this idiotic game ... I'm going home". He was replaced by Kenneth Horne until 1967, followed by David Franklin from 1970 to 1972.

A revival ran for one season in the 1990s on BBC Radio 4, hosted by Jeremy Beadle. A version with a rival line-up, produced by commercial station Radio Luxembourg, is not acknowledged by the BBC. Another revival, under the title Guess What?, was hosted by Barry Took for a single series in 1998.

A televised version ran from 1960 to 1961, produced by Associated-Rediffusion for ITV and hosted by Peter Jones (who later hosted in 1974). The "mystery voice" later became a running gag on the radio series I'm Sorry I Haven't A Clue.

The BBC World Service also broadcast a version called Animal, Vegetable and Mineral, chaired by Terry Wogan with a panel including Rachael Heyhoe Flint and Michael Flanders.

In the movie The 20 Questions Murder Mystery (1950) then members of the team, including Richard Dimbleby and Norman Hackforth, appear. Together with two newspaper reporters, they work to find the identity of a serial killer who sends in questions for the panel that prefigure his next victim.

See also
 20Q artificial intelligence
 Akinator, an online version which uses artificial intelligence
 Aswamedham, an Indian television quiz show
 Guess Who? board game
 List of programs broadcast by the DuMont Television Network
 List of surviving DuMont Television Network broadcasts
 Situation puzzle

References

Guessing games
Party games
1940s British game shows
1950s British game shows
1960s British game shows
1970s British game shows